Pel Dael Trov Yum is a 1972 Khmer film directed by Ung Kantuok starring Kong Som Eun and Vichara Dany. The plot, like other Ung Kantuok films, involves a triangular relationship between a man, Kong Som Eun, and 2 women, Vichara Dany and Kim Nova. The film consist of 5 hit songs including the all-time famous Pel Dael Tron Yum (The Time to Cry).

Soundtrack

References

Khmer-language films
1972 films
Cambodian drama films